Myrmecia borealis is an Australian ant which belongs to the genus Myrmecia. This species is native to Australia. Their distribution has only been recorded very few times in Queensland and New South Wales.

The head and thorax of the Myrmecia borealis is black. The top of the legs are black as well, but the bottom areas are yellowish brown. Mandibles are yellow and the middle part of the body is a reddish-brown colour.

References

Myrmeciinae
Hymenoptera of Australia
Insects described in 1991
Insects of Australia